Kardenakhi, also referred to as Kardenakh,  is a village in Georgia, in Gurjaani Municipality in Kakheti region. It is located 510 meters above sea level on the northeastern slope of the Tsiv-Gombori Range, on the Bakurtsikhe-Tsnori highway, 14 kilometers from Gurjaani. According to the 2014 census, 3873 people live in the village.

History 

Vachnadze is a common surname in the village. In the 17th century, a branch of the Sharvashidzes who migrated from Abkhazia settled in the village, who later took the surname Abkhaz.

Kardanakh is also referred to as Kardenakh in historical sources. Many branches of agriculture are developed in the village, including agriculture, animal husbandry and viticulture. According to popular tradition, the name of the village Kardanakhi is related to "good vineyard". According to Vakhushti Bagration, "Kardanakh has vineyards in the east and the wine here is good." The village belongs to Kiziq according to Istro. The army there had to stand under the banner of Bishop Bodbel. Kardanakh was originally part of Georgia, and later Kakheti Kingdom. From the end of the XVI-XVII centuries, separate feudal lords, Vachnadzes, Andronikashvilis and Abkhazishvilis staked on it. Ioane Bagrationi believes that the Abkhazians came to Kakheti from Abkhazia. In 1636, Teimuraz I of Kakheti received them as princes and served as serfs in Kardakhan. Baratashvili also had estates in Kardanakh. The mentioned feudal lords had disputes with each other over estates, mills and palaces.

According to the agreement of 1719, Vakhtang VI of Kartli helped the David II of Kakheti to fight against the Lekianoba. This army, under the command of Kaflanishvili, moved to Kardanakh and stood idle here for a whole month, because David II of Kakheti did not take out either the Kakhelis or the Kartlians to fight against the Lekianoba.

From the mercy of Teimuraz II of Kakheti in 1737, it can be seen that by this time the royal court has restored its own ownership of a part of the Kardanakhi serf estate.

In the second half of the 18th century, several cylindrical towers were built in the village of the royal government. In addition, the Kardanakhites participated in the construction of the castle-towers of Signagi, where they could shelter themselves if necessary. One of the towers of Sighnaghi Castle is called "Kordanakhisa Tower".

Ivane Javakhishvili mentions Kardanakh among the villages in which the days of St. George were exceptionally celebrated.

See also
 Kakheti

References

External links
Satellite map at Maplandia.com

Populated places in Gurjaani Municipality